Michael Scott Kasprowicz (born 10 February 1972) is a former Australian international cricketer, who played all formats of the game. He is a right arm fast bowler. He represented Queensland and played in the English county scene at first class level.

Personal life
A past student of Brisbane State High School, Kasprowicz is the older brother of former professional rugby union player Simon Kasprowicz. He holds a Masters of Business Administration from the University of Queensland. Kasprowicz is also a father to three children.

Domestic career
Kasprowicz made his debut for Queensland as a seventeen-year-old in the 1989–1990 domestic season. He was an AIS Australian Cricket Academy scholarship holder in 1990–1991.

In 1991, Kasprowicz played for the Australian Under-19 team which was captained by Damien Martyn. In the 1991/92 season, Kasprowicz became the youngest Australian to take 50 first-class wickets.

Kasprowicz represented Mumbai Champs in the Indian Cricket League. Kasprowicz's name was not added to the list of national contract awardees announced by the ACB on 1 May 2007.

International career
His solid performances for Queensland earned him a Test debut against West Indies in his native Brisbane in November 1996.  However, he would go through his first two Test matches for Australia wicketless.

Kasprowicz played in all the Tests on the tours of Sri Lanka and India in 2004, which were won 3–0 and 2–1. After being in and out of the side since his debut, Kasprowicz returned in 2004 to hold down a regular spot ahead of Brett Lee.

In the 2005 Ashes, Kasprowicz almost pulled off an escape for the Australian team in the second test at Edgbaston. On the final day England needed one last wicket with Kasprowicz and Brett Lee at the crease. However the two batsmen had edged Australia to within two runs of England. But then Kasprowicz gloved a Steve Harmison ball to Geraint Jones and England won. Though TV replays showed the dismissal should not have been given as Kasprowicz took his lower hand off the bat before ball hit glove. After the 2005 Ashes loss to England, Kasprowicz was dropped from the Australian team and his Cricket Australia contract was not extended. However, he had a successful 2005/06 domestic season with Queensland, taking 44 wickets. This effort earned him a tenth recall to the national side to replace Glenn McGrath as Brett Lee's new ball partner.

On 8 February 2008 he announced his retirement from all forms of cricket effective 16 February. Kasprowicz's best Test batting score of 25 was made against India, Kolkata, 1997–1998. His best Test bowling figures of 7 for 36 came against England, The Oval, 1997. Kasprowicz's best ODI Batting score of 28 not out was made against England, Lord's, 1997. His best ODI bowling figures of 5 for 45 came against Sri Lanka, Colombo, 2003–2004.

Post-retirement
Kasprowicz has been a director at Cricket Australia since 2011, although he briefly resigned from that position in 2016 to serve as interim CEO of Queensland Cricket.

References

External links

Australia One Day International cricketers
Australia Test cricketers
Australia Twenty20 International cricketers
Essex cricketers
Glamorgan cricketers
Leicestershire cricketers
Queensland cricketers
Cricketers at the 1998 Commonwealth Games
Commonwealth Games silver medallists for Australia
Australian people of Polish descent
1972 births
Living people
ICL World XI cricketers
Mumbai Champs cricketers
Cricketers from Brisbane
Australian cricketers
Australian Institute of Sport cricketers
People educated at Brisbane State High School
Commonwealth Games medallists in cricket
Medallists at the 1998 Commonwealth Games